Gilberto Duarte (born 6 July 1990) is a Portuguese handball player for Frisch Auf Göppingen and the Portuguese national team.

Personal life
Born in Portugal, Duarte is of Cape Verdean descent.

References

1990 births
Living people
People from Portimão
Portuguese male handball players
Portuguese people of Cape Verdean descent
FC Porto handball players
FC Barcelona Handbol players
Wisła Płock (handball) players
Montpellier Handball players
Handball players at the 2020 Summer Olympics
Sportspeople from Faro District